Julatten is a rural town and locality in the Shire of Mareeba, Queensland, Australia. In the  the locality of Julatten had a population of 1,091 people.

Geography 
The steep north-eastern part of locality consists of protected areas being the Mount Lewis National Park and the Mowbray National Park.

The Mossman - Mount Molloy Road traverses the locality from the north-east on the coastal plain up to the south-west passing through the area of Julatten on the tableland.

Julatten produces sugar cane and beef cattle and has barramundi farms.

History 
The area, which was settled in the early 1920s and originally known as Bushy Creek, takes its name from the railway station, which in turn was named by the Queensland Railways Department and is an Aboriginal word meaning small creek. The railway was opened to Rumula on 5 December 1926.

Bushy Creek State School opened on 27 August 1923. It was renamed Julatten State School in 1975.

Euluma State School opened circa 1935 and closed circa 1951.

In the  the locality of Julatten had a population of 1,091 people.

Education 
Julatten State School is a co-educational primary (P-6) school operated by the Queensland Government at 1141 Euluma Creek Road. In 2016, the school had an enrolment of 69 students with 6 teachers (4 full-time equivalent) and 6 non-teaching staff (4 full-time equivalent).

There is no secondary school in Julatten. The nearest secondary school is Mossman State High School in Mossman to the north.

Attractions 

On the ascent/descent of the range on the Mossman - Mount Molloy Road is the Lyons Lookout with a good view across the coastal areas to the north-east. There is a memorial commemorating the sealing of the road.

Julatten is a good area to see Wet Tropics bird species including endemic species.

References

External links 

 

Towns in Queensland
Shire of Mareeba
Localities in Queensland